Philippe Antoine Vessaz (20 June 1833 – 25 October 1911) was a Swiss politician and President of the Swiss Council of States (1878) and National Council (1881).

External links 
 
 

1833 births
1911 deaths
Members of the Council of States (Switzerland)
Presidents of the Council of States (Switzerland)
Members of the National Council (Switzerland)
Presidents of the National Council (Switzerland)
Free Democratic Party of Switzerland politicians